Kumar Sanu is an Indian playback singer, working primarily in Hindi films, he also sings in many other Indian languages, including English, Marathi, Assamese, Bhojpuri, Gujarati, Telugu, Malayalam, Kannada, Tamil, Punjabi, Oriya, Chhattisgarhi, Urdu, Pali, and his native language, Bengali.

Hindi films songs

Hindi Albums songs

Hindi Television songs

Bengali non-film songs

Telugu film Songs

Kannada film Songs

Oriya film Songs

Non-film Songs

Assamese songs

Film Songs

Punjabi songs

Non-film Songs

Bhojpuri film Songs

Non-film Songs

Nepali film Songs

Maithili film Songs

Haryanvi film Songs

Rajasthani film Songs

Urdu film Songs

As A Composer

Onscreen appearances

See also
 List of Indian playback singers
 Indian Music Industry

References

Male actor filmographies
Discographies of Indian artists
Lists of songs recorded by Indian singers
Indian filmographies